Coldharbour is a hamlet in the parish of Perranzabuloe, Cornwall, England.

References

Hamlets in Cornwall